The lined barb (Striuntius lineatus)  is a species of cyprinid fish native to Malaysia and Indonesia where it can be found in swamps, standing waters with submerged grasses and blackwater rivers. It can also be found in the aquarium trade.

Etymology
The genus name Striuntius is a combination of parts of the Latin "striatus", meaning "striated" and the genus name Puntius.  The specific epithet lineatus is Latin for "lined" referring to the color pattern of this fish.

References 

Barbinae
Cyprinid fish of Asia
Fish of Southeast Asia
Fish described in 1904
Taxa named by Georg Duncker